Hunting The Shadows: The Selected Stories of Tanith Lee, Volume Two is a 2009 collection of 12 fantasy and science fiction short stories by author Tanith Lee, published by Wildside Press. Only one story, "Queens in Crimson", is a previously unpublished work. The book includes an introduction by Donald Wollheim.

Most of the stories of the volume were written in the 1990s, the oldest one having been published in 1989. The story "Doll Skulls" is part of Lee's The Secret Books of Paradys series.

Volume one, titled Tempting The Gods, was previously published in February 2009.

Contents

Hunting The Shadows contains the following tales:

"The Woman in Scarlet"
"Zelle's Thursday"
"Unlocking the Golden Cage"
"The Eye in the Heart"
"Vermilia"
"Flower Water"
"Doll Skulls"
"Queens in Crimson"
"All the Birds of Hell"
"The Persecution Machine"
"Antonius Bequeathed"
"One for Sorrow"

2009 short story collections
Fantasy short story collections
Horror short story collections
Short story collections by Tanith Lee
Wildside Press books